Bamyan University (established approximately 1994 or 1997) is a public university in Bamyan, central Afghanistan.

History

Pre-Taliban
Bamyan University was initiated around 1994 (another source indicates 1997) with the support of the Hazara political party Hezb-i-Wahdat. Before the Taliban takeover of the area, there were 400-500 male and female students at Bamyan University, under 40 professors. In the mid-1990s, its facilities were simple, consisting of a few mud huts.

Taliban era
The university was closed by the Taliban after their capture of the city of Bamyan in September 1998. Two buildings were stripped for scrap, while the third was used as a Taliban barracks and communications center. This third building was destroyed by U.S. airstrikes at the start of the war in Afghanistan in 2001.

Islamic Republic of Afghanistan
Under the American and New Zealand Provincial Reconstruction Teams, the university was refurbished and reopened in 2004 with admission of 97 male and female students; the academic staff was 40 with a majority holding a master's degree. Construction was, at one point, delayed due to the need to clear landmines, leading to student protests. A number of Afghans who had taken refuge in Iran returned to Bamyan; of that group several female intellectuals became lecturers at the university.

See also
List of universities in Afghanistan

References

External links
 

Universities in Afghanistan
Hazarajat
Bamyan Province
1990s establishments in Afghanistan
Universities established in the 1990s